The Meissner equation is a linear ordinary differential equation that is a special case of Hill's equation with the periodic function given as a square wave.   There are many ways to write the Meissner equation.  One
is as

 

or

 

where
 
Another version is

 

The Meissner equation was first studied as a toy problem for certain resonance problems.  It is also useful for understand resonance problems in evolutionary biology.

Because the time-dependence is piecewise linear, many calculations can be performed exactly, unlike for the Mathieu equation.  When , the Floquet exponents are roots of the quadratic equation

 

The determinant of the Floquet matrix is 1, implying that origin is a center if 
and a saddle node otherwise.

References 

Ordinary differential equations